Enyimba Football Club or simply known as Enyimba, is a Nigerian football club based in the city of Aba which plays in the Nigerian Professional Football League. Their name means People's Elephant in Igbo language and is also the nickname used for the city of Aba.  Founded in 1976, the club rose to prominence in the 2000s and is considered the most successful Nigerian football club as they won two African Champions League titles, eight Nigerian championships and four Federation Cups since 2001.

History

Early years
The club was founded as a state-owned club in November 1976 by Jerry Amadi Enyeazu who was the first Director for Sports in the newly established Imo State, a province in southeast Nigeria. In August 1991 Imo State was divided further and the Abia State was created from the part of Imo which included the city of Aba, Enyimba's hometown, so the new state government took over as owners of Enyimba.

In the 1970s and 1980s Enyimba struggled to make a notable impact as the traditional powerhouses such as Enugu Rangers, Shooting Stars, Bendel Insurance and local rivals Iwuanyanwu Nationale dominated Nigerian football. Enyimba's rise to fame began in 1990 when the Professional League was inaugurated.

In their first season in the top division Enyimba finished 13th out of 16 clubs, winning just five out of 30 games with a goal difference 25–36. In the following season they won eight games but still finished 15th with 36 points, just one point short from escaping relegation behind Stationery Stores, and were relegated to second level for the 1992 season. Enyimba then stayed in the second level for the next two seasons before winning promotion in 1993, finishing first with 29 wins out of 46 games, winning a record 96 points with a goal difference 64–25, with most goals scored and fewest goals conceded in the 24-team league.

Back in top level, their string of good results continued, and they finished the 1994 season third, behind BCC Lions and Shooting Stars, missing out on a spot in the 1995 CAF Cup on goal difference. After a mediocre 1995 season, they won fourth place in 1996, before a series of inconsistent results saw them narrowly escaping relegation on goal difference in 1997 and finishing seventh in 1999 season

Shirts sponsor 2003 Gulder 2004. 2005 2006. Conil 2007 2008 2009 2010  2011. Dubic 2012 2013 2014 2015. - 2016. - 2017. - 2018. - 2019. - 2020. - 2021. 10bet 2022

Joma has been their kit manufacturer from 2010.

Home ground
Enyimba currently uses the Enyimba International Stadium located in the city of Aba in Abia State. The stadium was renovated in 2018.

Rise to prominence
Enyimba's fortunes began to change in 1999 when Orji Uzor Kalu was elected Governor of Abia State in the first democratic elections held in the country after several years of military rule. Kalu then proceeded to ensure generous funding for the local team and appointed Felix Anyansi Agwu as the new chairman of the club, who in turn appointed Godwin Koko Uwa as the club's first coach in the new era.

The appointment soon returned results, with Uwa leading Enyimba to their first Nigerian championship title in the 2001 season, as well as winning the Nigerian Super Cup in October 2001 by beating Dolphins 2–0 in Maiduguri. Their first silverware marked the beginning of a period of Enyimba's dominance in Nigerian football.

The People's Elephant experienced international football for the first time in August 2001, when they were invited to play Internazionale at San Siro in a charity friendly which marked the return of Ronaldo after a 21-month injury layoff and saw Enyimba thrashed 7–0 with four goals from Christian Vieri.

They also had their first appearance in a continental competition in the 2002 CAF Champions League. Due to the lack of a good playing pitch at their base in Aba, the club played their home matches in Calabar, a neighbouring town and the capital of the Cross River State. After winning the first round tie against Étoile Filante 5–3 on aggregate, they were knocked out in the second round by the 1998 Champions ASEC Mimosas of Côte d'Ivoire.

The defeat proved to be another turning point in the history of the club as it was the main cause for the club's rebuilding of what used to be a substandard playing pitch into the Enyimba International Stadium, a 15,000 capacity stadium equipped with floodlights, electronic scoreboard and covered seats, which was later inspected by the CAF president Issa Hayatou and was officially approved for that year's CAF Champions League matches.

The club went on to win their second successive league title in 2002, and then became the first Nigerian club to win the continent's premier international club competition in the 2003 CAF Champions League by beating Ismaily of Egypt 2–1 on aggregate, under coach Kadiri Ikhana. This was also the first time since 1996 that a Nigerian club had reached the final of the competition. Several key players from Enyimba's 2003 continental success have since gone on to play for Nigeria (Vincent Enyeama, Obinna Nwaneri and Onyekachi Okonkwo) and Benin Republic National Team (Muri Ogunbiyi).

Enyimba then successfully defended their title as won their second consecutive African Champions League title in 2004, beating Tunisia's Étoile du Sahel in the finals. After finishing runners-up in the national championship in 2004 (behind Dolphins), Enyimba won the Double in 2005, winning their fourth Nigerian championship and their first Nigerian Cup.

2003–2008: awards
In 2003, Enyimba won the best team in Africa award while coach Kadiri emerged the best coach. In 2004, the club retained the best coach award while the club's first choice goalkeeper, Vincent Enyeama won the Champions league player of the year.

These two Champions league victories in the hands of West African teams, plus the second CAF Super Cup against Accra Hearts of Oak finally brought Enyimba to the limelight of African football. The team signed a $300,000 uniform deal with Joma in 2008.

2008–09 season
The team finished third in the Premier League with 64 points. On 12 July, Enyimba defeated Sharks FC by a lone goal at the Teslim Balogun Stadium to lift the 2009 Federation Cup and qualified for the CAF Confederation Cup 2010.

2012–13 season
The team was on course to reclaim the League title from Kano Pillars but crowd trouble forced the match to be abandoned. A rearranged match on 9 October 2013 in Lokoja saw them lose to Pillars who eventually won the league with 63 points while Enyimba finished with 62 points.

Enyimba would however go on to win the Nigerian FA Cup that year where they faced Warri Wolves in the finals. The match ended 2–2 and 5–4 on penalties.

2013–14 season
The 2013–14 season started in abysmal form for the People's Elephants. They were knocked out of the CAF Champions League by Real Bamako and they had a stuttering start to their own campaign. They ended the first half of the season in 6th place after Giwa FC who were led by Enyimba's Champions League winning coach Kadiri Ikhana held them to a goalless draw in Aba. They made a move for Ikhana at the start of the second half, firing the then technical adviser, Zachary Baraje.

The team eventually finished second in that Premier League season with 64 points. They finished behind Kano Pillars who they beat 3–1 on the last day of the season. It was a campaign that saw them win just 1 out of their 6 Oriental Derbies, the only win being a 2–1 home win to Rangers International. State Rivals Abia Warriors beat them 1–0 in Aba, Cletus Itodo getting the decisive goal. They also dropped points in Aba to Giwa FC and Heartland of Owerri.

Enyimba striker Mfon Udoh set a new goal scoring record of the season, scoring 23 goals. Emem Eduok of Dolphins finished behind him with 21 goals both beating Jude Aneke's record of 20 goals.

The season ended on a high like the previous season as Enyimba won the 2014 Edition of the Federations Cup at the Teslim Balogun Stadium in Lagos on 23 November 2014, beating Dolphins 2–1 in the finals. Mfon Udoh scored Enyimba's first while Chinonso Okonkwo got the second. Emem Eduok pulled one back for Dolphins.

2016 season
The 2016 season was not so favorable for People's Elephants as end the season being ninth on the league with 50 points.

2017 season
Enyimba finished third in the league with 61 points. The third position saw Enyimba qualify to represent Nigeria at the CAF Confederations Cup the following season.

Honours

Domestic
Nigerian Premier League
 Champions (8): 2001, 2002, 2003, 2005, 2007, 2009–10, 2015, 2019

Nigerian FA Cup
 Champions (4): 2005, 2009, 2013, 2014

National Second Division
 Champions: 1993

Nigerian Super Cup
 Champions (4): 2001, 2003, 2010, 2013

International
CAF Champions League
 Champions (2): 2003, 2004

CAF Super Cup
 Champions (2): 2004, 2005

Current squad
As of 12 February 2023

Performance in CAF competitions
CAF Champions League: 8 appearances
2002 – Second Round
2003 – Champion (Enyimba International F.C. season 2003)
2004 – Champion
2005 – Group stage (Top 8)
2006 – Group stage (Top 8)
2008 – Semi-finals
2011 – Semi-finals
2014 – First round
2015 – First round
2016 – Group stage (Top 8)
2020 – First round

CAF Confederation Cup: 2 appearances
2010 – Second Round of 16
2018 – Semi-finals
2020 – Quarter-finals

Coaching history

 Finidi George (Sept 2021 – current)

Notable players
 Ibrahim Mustapha
 Dare Ojo
 Vincent Enyeama
 Obinna Nwaneri
 Mouritala Ogunbiyi
 Uche Kalu
 Onyekachi Okonkwo
 Joetex Frimpong
 Ikechukwu Ezenwa
 Chinedu Udoji
 Valentine Ozornwafor
 Stephen Worgu
 Romanus Orjinta
 Dele Aiyenugba
 Ikouwem Udo
 Anayo Iwuala

References

External links
Official web site

 
Association football clubs established in 1976
Football clubs in Nigeria
Abia State
1976 establishments in Nigeria
Sports clubs in Nigeria
CAF Champions League winning clubs
CAF Super Cup winning clubs